Amata phepsalotis  is a species of moth of the family Erebidae first described by Edward Meyrick in 1886. It is found in Australia.

References 

phepsalotis
Moths described in 1886
Moths of Australia